Higher Forces is the third album by the Luton-based hip hop group Phi Life Cypher.

Track listing
 "Higher Forces" (1:56)
 "Seek & Destroy" (4:27)
 "Overemix" (3:02)
 "Rap It Up" (3:27)
 "Real Raw" (2:42)
 "The Desert" (3:32)
 "War" (0:49)
 "War Of Words "Merciles" (4:34)
 "Skit. The Drive" (0:37)
 "Free" (4:24)
 "Cypher Refunk" (3:27) 
 "The Three" (4:05)
 "Big Sound" (4:51)
 "Ending Force" (0:54)

References

2003 albums
Phi Life Cypher albums